Ram Babu Gupta (17 July 1935 – 27 April 2008) was an Indian cricket umpire. He stood in 11 Test matches between 1986 and 1988 and 24 ODI games between 1985 and 1990. In 1987 he became the first Indian to umpire in a Cricket World Cup final.

See also
 List of Test cricket umpires
 List of One Day International cricket umpires

References

1935 births
2008 deaths
People from Delhi
Indian Test cricket umpires
Indian One Day International cricket umpires